Outer membrane protein W (OmpW) family is a family of evolutionarily related proteins from the bacterial outer membrane.

This family includes outer membrane protein W (OmpW) proteins from a variety of bacterial species. This protein may form the receptor for S4 colicins in Escherichia coli.

References

Protein domains
Protein families
Outer membrane proteins